Leon Klinghoffer (September 24, 1916 – October 8, 1985) was an American man who was shot, killed and thrown overboard from the cruise ship Achille Lauro by members of the Palestinian Liberation Front who hijacked the ship in 1985.

Personal life
Klinghoffer grew up on Suffolk Street in the Lower East Side neighborhood of New York City. Among his close friends was Jack Kirby, who became a major figure in the history of comic books.

Klinghoffer married Marilyn (born Windwehr), the daughter of a haberdasher, in September 1949. The couple had two daughters. Klinghoffer suffered two strokes later in his life that left him in a wheelchair.

Career
While he was growing up, Klinghoffer worked in his family's hardware store, Klinghoffer Supply Company. In 1942, he joined the Army Air Force and was trained as a navigator. He flew missions in B-24 Liberator bombers with the 93rd Bombardment Group in the European theater of World War II.

After his honorable discharge from the Army in January 1944, Klinghoffer and his brother Albert took over the store and began to invent appliances. A few years later, the two brothers founded the Roto-Broil Corporation of America. Their feature item was the Roto-Broil Rotisserie Oven or Roto-Broil 400, a common kitchen appliance in the 1950s.

Hijacking and shooting

In 1985, Klinghoffer (then 69, retired, and in a wheelchair) was on a cruise on the Achille Lauro with his wife Marilyn to celebrate their 36th wedding anniversary. On October 7, four hijackers from the Palestine Liberation Front (PLF) took control of the liner off Egypt as it was sailing from Alexandria to Port Said, Egypt. Holding the passengers and crew hostage, they ordered the captain to sail to Tartus, Syria, and demanded the release of 50 Palestinians, then in Israeli prisons, including the Lebanese prisoner Samir Kuntar, who had been responsible for the murder of five civilians in a terrorist attack in 1979.

If the prisoners were not released, the hijackers said they would begin killing hostages, "We will start executing at 3:00 p.m. sharp." Syria, having consulted with the U.S. and Italian governments, did not respond to any of the demands.

As 3:00 p.m. neared, the terrorists began to decide who to kill by shuffling the U.S., British, and Austrian hostages' passports. They selected Leon Klinghoffer to be killed first. Several reasons have been put forward that may have contributed to why Klinghoffer was chosen. Earlier in the hijacking, he had refused to be silent when gunmen took his watch and cigarettes, becoming brusque and complaining in his slurred speech; this antagonized some of the hijackers, though one of them gave Klinghoffer his possessions back. Additionally, Klinghoffer was Jewish and American, and his wheelchair made him both difficult to move around the ship and an absence less likely to trigger a chain reaction of resistance among the surviving hostages. One of the hijackers, Youssef Majed al-Molqi, later gave a statement on why he was chosen: "I and Bassm [al-Ashker] agreed that the first hostage to be killed had to be an American. I chose Klinghoffer, an invalid, so that they would know that we had no pity for anyone, just as the Americans, arming Israel, do not take into consideration that Israel kills women and children of our people."

Molqi ordered Manuel De Souza, a Portuguese waiter, to accompany him and push Klinghoffer outside onto the open deck. Klinghoffer was taken back along the entire deck of the ship to the stern. Molqi ordered De Souza to return into the ship. The other terrorists moved the rest of the hostages back down into the lounge. Marilyn Klinghoffer noticed that Leon was not there and began to weep. Molqi shot Leon Klinghoffer once in the head and again in the chest. He died instantly, toppling onto his face. Molqi then went in and ordered De Souza to throw the body over the side of the ship. When De Souza was unable to do the task alone, Molqi found Italian hairdresser Ferruccio Alberti and forced the two of them at gunpoint to throw the body and then the wheelchair into the sea.

Several of the hostages heard the shots and splashes, including Marilyn Klinghoffer. She pleaded with the hijackers to let her see her husband in the infirmary, but they refused. She feared the worst but remained hopeful. She learned the truth only after the hijackers left the ship at Port Said. Molqi, with blood splattered clothing, returned to the other terrorists and told them "I have killed the American." He and Bassam al-Ashker then went to the bridge. Handing Klinghoffer's passport to Captain De Rosa, he raised a finger and said "boom, boom."

Molqi ordered De Rosa to tell the Syrians that a passenger had been killed and that they were prepared to kill another. The Syrians responded by telling Molqi to "go back where you came from." Finding no help in Syria, Molqi ordered De Rosa to sail for Libya. Palestine Liberation Organization (PLO) Foreign Secretary Farouq Qaddumi said that perhaps the terminally ill Marilyn had killed her husband for insurance money. However, the PLF leader Muhammad Abbas said in 1996 that the hijack was a mistake and apologized for killing Klinghoffer.

Initially, the hijackers were granted safe passage to Tunisia, but U.S. President Ronald Reagan ordered a U.S. fighter plane to intercept the getaway plane, forcing it to land at Naval Air Station Sigonella in Italy. After an extradition dispute, Italian authorities arrested and tried the Palestinian terrorists but decided that there was insufficient evidence to link Abu Abbas to the hijacking.

Klinghoffer's body was found by Syrians on October 14 or 15, and it was returned to the United States around October 20. His funeral, with 800 mourners in attendance, was held at Temple Shaaray Tefila in New York City. Klinghoffer was buried at Beth David Memorial Park in Kenilworth, New Jersey. On February 9, four months after his death, his wife (1926–1986) died of cancer. They were survived by two daughters, Ilsa and Lisa Klinghoffer.

Aftermath
Five days after the murder, Rabbi Morris Gordon and a group of student activists led a mock Jewish funeral service for Leon Klinghoffer in front of the Palestinian Liberation Organization's Washington, D.C., office to call attention to the group's role in the killing of an American military veteran.

Following the death of their parents, the Klinghoffers' daughters established the Leon and Marilyn Klinghoffer Memorial Foundation with the Anti-Defamation League. The foundation combats terrorism through educational, political, and legal means. The foundation is funded by an undisclosed settlement paid by the PLO to the Klinghoffers to settle a lawsuit seeking damages for the PLO's role in the hijacking (Klinghoffer v. PLO, 739 F. Supp. 854 (S.D.N.Y. 1990) and Klinghoffer v. PLO, 937 F.2d 44, 50 (2d Cir. 1991). This lawsuit spurred passage of the Antiterrorism Act of 1990, which made it easier for victims of terrorism to sue terrorists and collect civil damages for losses incurred.

PLF leader Muhammad Zaidan, a.k.a. Abu Abbas, was freed by the Italian government in the aftermath of the Achille Lauro affair, but was continually sought by the United States government. The Clinton administration, aware of Abbas' resurfacing in Gaza, neither asked for his extradition nor requested he be turned over to Italy who had found him guilty in absentia. The U.S. Senate passed a resolution 99–0 asking President Bill Clinton to request Abbas' extradition to the US. He was captured in Iraq in 2003 by U.S. forces during the 2003 invasion of Iraq, and he died in custody a year later of heart disease, according to the U.S. government.

The ship involved in the hijacking, the Achille Lauro, returned to cruise duty until she was caught on fire off the coast of Somalia on November 30, 1994. After evacuating the ship of passengers, the crew could not control the fire, and the abandoned ship sank on December 2. Two people died.

Portrayals

The hijacking was made into a television movie in 1990, Voyage of Terror: The Achille Lauro Affair starring Burt Lancaster and Eva Marie Saint.

Klinghoffer was portrayed by Karl Malden in the 1989 television film The Hijacking of the Achille Lauro.

The concept of the opera The Death of Klinghoffer originated with theatre director Peter Sellars, who was a major collaborator, as was choreographer Mark Morris. It was American composer John Adams' second opera, based on the events of 1985. It opened to great controversy in 1991. It featured a libretto by Alice Goodman. In the opera, Klinghoffer sings two arias, one shortly before he is killed and one after his death. The Los Angeles Opera shared in the work's commission but never presented it. The opera has since drawn controversy, including allegations by some (including Klinghoffer's two daughters) that the opera is antisemitic and glorifies terrorism. The work's creators and others have disputed these criticisms. A Prix Italia-winning television version of the opera, starring Sanford Sylvan and Christopher Maltman, and directed by Penny Woolcock, was screened by United Kingdom's Channel 4 in 2003.

Klinghoffer (and his supposed travel diary) play a minor role in Philip Roth's 1993 novel Operation Shylock.

Klinghoffer is also mentioned in the graphic novel Palestine by Joe Sacco.

See also
Alex Odeh

References

External links
 CNN report by David Ensor
 Klinghoffer Family Papers at the American Jewish Historical Society, New York
 Mitchell Cohen, "Going Under with Klinghoffer", Jewish Review of Books, Spring 2015

1916 births
1985 deaths
20th-century American businesspeople
American businesspeople in retailing
American manufacturing businesspeople
Jewish American military personnel
American people murdered abroad
American people with disabilities
American terrorism victims
Antisemitic attacks and incidents
Businesspeople from New York City
Deaths by firearm in Syria
MS Achille Lauro
Murdered American Jews
People from the Lower East Side
People murdered in Syria
Terrorism deaths in Syria
20th-century American Jews
United States Army Air Forces personnel of World War II